"This Feeling" is a song by the English singer-songwriter Sam Brown, written by Sam Brown and Margo Buchanan. It appears on her debut studio album Stop!, and is one of two songs (along with I'll Be in Love") from the album to feature the guitar work of then Pink Floyd member David Gilmour.

Track listings

CD single – UK
"This Feeling (Remix)"
"Window People"
"Soldiers"
"Pitful World"

7" single – UK
"This Feeling"
"Soldiers"

12" single – UK
Side A
"This Feeling (Remix)"
"Window People"

Side B
"Soldiers"
"Pitiful World"

Personnel
Credits are adapted from the album's liner notes.
Sam Brown – lead vocals
David Gilmour – guitar
Richard Newman – drums
Jim Leverton – bass guitar
Danny Schogger – piano; keyboards; piano accordion
Pete Brown – acoustic guitars
Vicki Brown – backing vocals

Charts and sales

Weekly charts

References

1988 singles
1980s ballads
Sam Brown (singer) songs
1988 songs
A&M Records singles
Songs written by Margo Buchanan
Songs written by Sam Brown (singer)